The Ministry of Energy’s responsibility is ensuring that Ontario's electricity system functions with reliability and productivity, and promoting innovation in the energy sector. In April 2002, it was renamed the Ministry of Energy, with the newly created Ministry of Enterprise, Opportunity and Innovation taking over responsibility for its science and technology portfolio. It was integrated as the Ministry of Energy and Infrastructure between 2007 and 2010, before it was split back into the Ministry of Energy on August 18, 2010. The Minister of Energy is the Honourable Greg Rickford.

In 2021, the Ministry of Energy again became a separate ministry when the Ministry of Energy, Northern Development and Mines merged with the Ministry of Natural Resources and Forestry to form the Ministry of Northern Development, Mines, Natural Resources and Forestry.

Responsibilities

Several agencies and crown corporations are under the Ministry:

 Hydro One 1999–present; created from the breakup of Ontario Hydro
 Independent Electricity System Operator (IESO) 1998–present; created from the breakup of Ontario Hydro
 Ontario Power Authority 2004-2015; now merged with IESO; created from the breakup of Ontario Hydro
 Ontario Energy Board 1999–present; created from the breakup of Ontario Hydro
 Ontario Power Generation (OPG) 1999–present; created from the breakup of Ontario Hydro

From 1974 to 1999 Ontario Hydro reported to the Minister, but the public utility was broken up into various agencies and crown corporations. Prior to 1974 Ontario Hydro reported to Commissioners appointed by the Premier and a few were Ministers without Portfolio.

The Commission was headed by a Chairman:

 Sir Adam Beck 1906-1925 -referred to as Minister of Power
 John Robert Cooke 1931-1934
 Robert H. Saunders 1948-1953
 George E Gathercole 1962-1974

History
The Department of Energy Resources was established by legislation in 1959. The Ontario Fuel Board was also attached to the department until 1960. When the board was dissolved in 1960, its administrative functions were assumed by the department, while its judicial functions were taken over by the Ontario Energy Board.

In 1964, the department acquired responsibility over the conservation authorities from the Department of Lands and Forests, and was renamed the Department of Energy and Resources Management.

In 1970, the energy responsibilities of the department, including the Ontario Energy Board, were removed and transferred to the Department of Mines and Northern Affairs.  The remaining responsibilities over conservation, air management and waste manager form the new Department of the Environment in 1971.

In 1973, the Ministry of Energy was re-established, assuming responsibilities over energy policy; energy conservation and planning; and energy technology development. Agencies which reported to the ministry included the Ontario Energy Board, the Ontario Energy Corporation, and Ontario Hydro.

Over the years, the ministry was merged with various other ministries: 
 Between 1993 and 1997, the ministry was amalgamated with the Ministry of the Environment to form the Ministry of Environment and Energy
 Between 1997 and 2002, the ministry took on responsibility for Science and Technology and was known as the Ministry of Energy, Science and Technology.
 Between April to August 2002, the ministry was again briefly merged with Ministry of the Environment to form the Ministry of Environment and Energy
 Between 2008 and 2010, the ministry was merged with the Ministry of Public Infrastructure Renewal to form the Ministry of Energy and Infrastructure
 Between 2018 and 2021, the ministry was merged with the Ministry of Northern Development and Mines to form the Ministry of Energy, Northern Development and Mines

List of Ministers

References

External links
 Ministry of Energy
 Minister's biography

Energy
Ontario